A cheesesteak (also known as a Philadelphia cheesesteak, Philly cheesesteak, cheesesteak sandwich,  cheese steak, or steak and cheese) is a sandwich made from thinly sliced pieces of beefsteak and melted cheese in a long hoagie roll. A popular regional fast food, it has its roots in the U.S. city of Philadelphia, Pennsylvania.

History 
The cheesesteak was developed in the early 20th century "by combining frizzled beef, onions, and cheese in a small loaf of bread", according to a 1987 exhibition catalog published by the Library Company of Philadelphia and the Historical Society of Pennsylvania.

Philadelphians Pat and Harry Olivieri are often credited with inventing the sandwich by serving chopped steak on an Italian roll in the early 1930s.  The exact story behind its creation is debated, but in some accounts, Pat and Harry Olivieri originally owned a hot dog stand, and on one occasion, decided to make a new sandwich using chopped beef and grilled onions.  While Pat was eating the sandwich, a cab driver stopped by and was interested in it, so he requested one for himself.  After eating it, the cab driver suggested that Olivieri quit making hot dogs and instead focus on the new sandwich.  They began selling this variation of steak sandwiches at their hot dog stand near South Philadelphia's Italian Market. They became so popular that Pat opened up his own restaurant which still operates today as Pat's King of Steaks.  The sandwich was originally prepared without cheese; Olivieri said provolone cheese was first added by Joe "Cocky Joe" Lorenza, a manager at the Ridge Avenue location.

Cheesesteaks have become popular at restaurants and food carts throughout the city with many locations being independently owned, family-run businesses. Variations of cheesesteaks are now common in several fast food chains. Versions of the sandwich can also be found at high-end restaurants. Many establishments outside of Philadelphia refer to the sandwich as a "Philly cheesesteak".

Description

Meat
The meat traditionally used is thinly sliced rib-eye or top round, although other cuts of beef are also used. On a lightly oiled griddle at medium temperature, the steak slices are quickly browned and then scrambled into smaller pieces with a flat spatula. Slices of cheese are then placed over the meat, letting it melt, and then the roll is placed on top of the cheese. The mixture is then scooped up with a spatula and pressed into the roll, which is then cut in half.

Common additions include sautéed onions, grilled mushrooms, ketchup, hot sauce, salt, and black pepper.

Bread
In Philadelphia, cheesesteaks are invariably served on hoagie rolls. Among several brands, perhaps the most famous are Amoroso rolls; these rolls are long, soft, and slightly salted. One source writes that "a proper cheesesteak consists of provolone or Cheez Whiz slathered on an Amoroso roll and stuffed with thinly shaved grilled meat," while a reader's letter to an Indianapolis magazine, lamenting the unavailability of good cheesesteaks, wrote that "the mention of the Amoroso roll brought tears to my eyes." After commenting on the debates over types of cheese and "chopped steak or sliced", Risk and Insurance magazine declared, "The only thing nearly everybody can agree on is that it all has to be piled onto a fresh, locally baked Amoroso roll."

Cheese
American cheese, Provolone, and Cheez Whiz are the most commonly used cheeses or cheese products put on to the Philly cheesesteak.

White American cheese, along with provolone cheese, are the favorites due to their mild flavor and medium consistency. Some establishments melt the American cheese to achieve the creamy consistency, while others place slices over the meat, letting them melt slightly under the heat. Philadelphia Inquirer restaurant critic Craig LaBan says, "Provolone is for aficionados, extra-sharp for the most discriminating among them." Geno's owner, Joey Vento, said, "We always recommend the provolone. That's the real cheese."

Cheez Whiz, first marketed in 1952, was not yet available for the original 1930 version, but has spread in popularity. A 1986 New York Times article called Cheez Whiz "the sine qua non of cheesesteak connoisseurs." In a 1985 interview, Pat Olivieri's nephew Frank Olivieri said that he uses "the processed cheese spread familiar to millions of parents who prize speed and ease in fixing the children's lunch for the same reason, because it is fast." Cheez Whiz is "overwhelmingly the favorite" at Pat's, outselling runner-up American by a ratio of eight or ten to one, while Geno's claims to go through eight to ten cases of Cheez Whiz a day.

Variations
 A chicken cheesesteak or chicken Philly is made with chicken instead of beef.
 A mushroom cheesesteak is a cheesesteak topped with mushrooms.
 A pepper cheesesteak is a cheesesteak topped with green bell peppers, hot cherry peppers, long hot peppers, or sweet peppers.
 A pizza steak is a cheesesteak topped with pizza sauce and mozzarella cheese and may be toasted in a broiler.
 A cheesesteak hoagie contains lettuce and tomato in addition to the ingredients found in the traditional steak sandwich, and may contain other elements often served in a hoagie.
 A vegan cheesesteak is a sandwich that replaces steak and cheese with vegan ingredients, such as seitan or mushrooms for the steak, and soy-based cheese.
 A steak milano is a cheesesteak containing grilled or fried tomatoes and oregano.
The Heater is served at Phillies baseball games at Citizens Bank Park, so named for being a spicy variation as it is topped with jalapeños, Buffalo sauce, and jalapeño cheddar.

See also 

 Barros Luco
 Hoagie
 Italian beef
 List of American sandwiches
 List of regional dishes of the United States
 List of sandwiches
 List of steak dishes
 Roast beef sandwich
 Steak sandwich

References

External links 
An Illustrated History of the Philadelphia Cheesesteak

American sandwiches
Cheese sandwiches
Cuisine of Philadelphia
Cuisine of the Mid-Atlantic states
Italian-American cuisine
Italian-American culture in Philadelphia
Fast food
Beef sandwiches
Cheese dishes